Anolis bellipeniculus is a species of lizard in the family Dactyloidae. The species is found in Venezuela.

References

Anoles
Reptiles of Venezuela
Endemic fauna of Venezuela
Reptiles described in 1996
Taxa named by Charles W. Myers
Taxa named by Maureen Ann Donnelly